Lotusiphantes is a monotypic genus of East Asian dwarf spiders containing the single species, Lotusiphantes nanyuensis. It was first described by J. Chen & C. M. Yin in 2001, and has only been found in China.

See also
 List of Linyphiidae species (I–P)

References

Linyphiidae
Monotypic Araneomorphae genera
Spiders of China